Lyashko or Liashko is a gender-neutral Ukrainian surname that may refer to
Oleg Lyashko (swimmer) (born 1982), Uzbekistani swimmer 
Oleh Lyashko (born 1972), Ukrainian politician
First Lyashko Government
Radical Party of Oleh Lyashko
Oleksandr Liashko (1915–2002), Ukrainian politician

See also
 
 

Ukrainian-language surnames